Mikhail Mikhaylovich Ryzhak (March 10, 1927 – March 2003) was a Ukrainian water polo player who competed for the Soviet Union in the 1956 Summer Olympics.

He was born in Kharkiv, Ukrainian SSR.

Ryzhak was part of the Soviet team which won the bronze medal in the 1956 tournament. He played one match as goalkeeper.

See also
 Soviet Union men's Olympic water polo team records and statistics
 List of Olympic medalists in water polo (men)
 List of men's Olympic water polo tournament goalkeepers

External links
 

1927 births
2003 deaths
Sportspeople from Kharkiv
Ukrainian male water polo players
Soviet male water polo players
Water polo goalkeepers
Olympic water polo players of the Soviet Union
Water polo players at the 1956 Summer Olympics
Olympic bronze medalists for the Soviet Union
Olympic medalists in water polo
Medalists at the 1956 Summer Olympics